Ranhera is a village and a Gram Panchayat in Jewar block of Gautam Buddha Nagar District in the Indian state of Uttar Pradesh.

Location

Ranhera is located in the suburbs of about 30 km. Greater Noida about 60 km from Noida and 66 km from New Delhi and is situated on the northeast bank of the Yamuna River. It is located between 28.13° North latitude and 77.55° East longitude at a height of 195 metres (639 feet) above mean sea level. Ranhera is situated near yamuna expressway (Noida to Agra) about 7 km far away.(Airport Land)
the land of naga baba. Now move to Faleda Cut.

Overview 

History records that the town was named after the sage Sri Nagababa. In the west of Ranhera at a distance of 1 km is an ashram and an old temple of the Sri Nagababa. Other temples in the town is the chawk Mandir and the Shiv mandir. There is a Sarva UP Gramin Bank (PNB) Branch.

Shri Rajaram Hospital provide affordable and competent care to all sections of society "a good patient care & concern with dedication for patient and their family since early nineteenth century". Ranhera village comes under YEIDA (Yamuna Expressway Industrial Development Area). Its member of the Legislative Assembly is Dhirendra Singh, Ranhera falls under Jewar Constituency.

According to the Indian census report published in 2014, a population of 7800 was recorded. Males account for 52% of the population and females account for 48% of the population. In Ranhera, 22% of the population is less than six years of age. The census report throws light on the literacy rate of the village which is 51% which is lower than the national average literacy rate of 59.5%. The male literacy rate is 54% and the female literacy rate is 46%.

It is located in the outskirts of Greater Noida, the district headquarters are located in New Okhla Industrial Development Authority (Noida) itself. An eight-lane Yamuna Expressway connects Jewar from Greater Noida and Agra. This whole district including Noida/Greater Noida is said to be one of the most fast developing areas of India, it is about 46 km The Buddh International Circuit is an Indian motor racing circuit in Greater Noida(Dankaur)

Before realignment of Jewar to Gautam Budh Nagar, it was part of Bulandshahr district of U.P.

Primary and secondary education

Most schools in the state are affiliated to Uttar Pradesh Madhyamik Shiksha Parishad (commonly referred to as U.P board) with English or Hindi as the medium of instruction, while schools affiliated to Central Board of Secondary Education(CBSE) English as medium of instruction are also present.

Culture
Ranhera is a cosmopolitan city due to the multi-ethnic and multi-cultural presence of the vast Indian bureaucracy and political status has amplified the importance of national events and holidays. National events such as Republic Day, Independence Day and Gandhi Jayanti (Gandhi's birthday) are celebrated with great enthusiasm in Ranhera and the rest of India. On India's Independence Day (15 August) celebrate the day by flying kites, which are considered a symbol of freedom. The Republic Day Parade.

Religious festivals include Diwali (the festival of light), Maha Shivaratri, and Ganesh chaturthi is most festival in village Teej, Durga Puja, Holi, Budha baba, Raksha Bandhan. Vasant Panchami (the Spring Festival) is held every year in Ranhera.

Connectivity 

Ranhera is mainly connected to other major sites through roads and rail network. People commute to Delhi by rail from Palwal, Khurja and Vear. Khurja is around 27 km from Ranhera and Palwal is around 38 km away. Palwal is main Annaj Mandi and farmers go there to sell their crops. Palwal is city of Haryana, Initially part of Faridabad district but from 2008, Palwal is a separate district. Some state bus also run 2 times a day to Greater Noida District center.

Ranhera is a village with high property value. In the west is Haryana state. Ranhera of Jewar is a Tehsil, and well connected to many tehsils and districts by road namely Khurja, Sikandrabad, Bulandshahr, Khair, Aligarh and Palwal (District - Faridabad in Haryana).)

Bhabokara (2 km), Deorar (3 km), Parohi (3 km), Khwajpur (3 km), Rohi (3 km) are the nearby Villages to Ranhera. Ranhera is surrounded by Tappal Tehsil towards South, Chandaus Tehsil towards East, Hassanpur Tehsil towards South, Khurja Tehsil towards East.

Palwal, Bulandshahr, Sikandrabad, Hodal are the nearby Cities to Ranhera.

This Place is in the border of the Gautam Buddha Nagar District and Aligarh District. Aligarh District Tappal is South towards this place. Also it is in the Border of other district Faridabad. It is near to the Haryana State Border.

References 

Villages in Gautam Buddh Nagar district